The 1989 African Cup of Champions Clubs Final was a football tie held over two legs in December 1989 between Raja Casablanca, and MC Oran.

Road to the final

First leg

Match details

Second leg

Match details

Notes and references

Notes

References

External links
1989 African Cup of Champions Clubs - cafonline.com

1989
1
CAF Champions League
CAF Champions League
1989–90 in Moroccan football
1989–90 in Algerian football
CAF Champions League Final 1989